Salvatore Puccio (born 31 August 1989) is an Italian racing cyclist, who currently rides for UCI WorldTeam .

Career

Puccio was born at Menfi, in Sicily. He joined  ahead of the 2012 season, after a 2011 season which included a solo victory in the under-23 Tour of Flanders race in April.

Puccio made his Grand Tour debut at the 2013 Giro d'Italia. After  won the team time trial on stage two, Puccio took the race lead and wore the pink jersey on stage three, after being the highest placed  rider on stage one. Puccio kicked off his season in 2018 with an entry in the Tour Down Under.

Major results

2007
 5th Overall Giro della Toscana Junior
1st Points classification
1st Stage 2
 5th Overall Giro della Lunigiana
2010
 5th GP Pretola
 5th Gran Premio San Giuseppe
 6th Gran Premio Industrie del Marmo
 9th Trofeo Edil C
2011
 1st Ronde van Vlaanderen U23
 2nd GP Pretola
 2nd Giro del Belvedere
 2nd Gran Premio Palio del Recioto
 4th Overall Giro della Toscana
1st Stage 3
 4th Trofeo Banca Popolare di Vicenza
 5th GP Capodarco
2012
 6th Trofeo Deià
2013
 Giro d'Italia
1st Stage 2 (TTT)
Held  after Stage 2
2014
 8th Gran Premio Città di Camaiore
2015
 7th Overall Tour of Slovenia
1st  Points classification
2016
 1st Stage 1 (TTT) Vuelta a España

Grand Tour general classification results timeline

Notes

References

External links

 Salvatore Puccio profile at Team Ineos
 

1989 births
Living people
People from Menfi
Italian male cyclists
Sportspeople from the Province of Agrigento
Cyclists from Sicily
21st-century Italian people
20th-century Italian people